Father Berrigan may refer to:
 Daniel Berrigan, American Catholic priest and peace activist, brother of Philip
 Philip Berrigan, American Catholic priest and peace activist, brother of Daniel